John Hodges (1855–1933) was an Australian cricketer.

John Hodges may also refer to:
Jack Hodges, 1880s Australian cricket official a.k.a. George Hodges
John Hodges (minstrel) (1821–1891), 19th century American entertainer known professionally as Cool White
Johnny Hodges (1906–1970), American musician
John Hodges (Australian politician) (born 1937)
John Hodges (English politician), 16th century Member of Parliament
John Hodges (footballer) (born 1980), English football goalkeeper
John Neal Hodges (1884–1965), United States Army officer
John Hodges, cofounder of A24

See also
John Hodge (disambiguation)
John Hodgman (born 1971), American writer & actor